Yanyuwa is the language of the Yanyuwa people of the Sir Edward Pellew Group of Islands in the Gulf of Carpentaria outside Borroloola in the Northern Territory, Australia.

Yanyuwa, like many other Australian Aboriginal languages, is a highly agglutinative language with ergative-absolutive alignment, whose grammar is pervaded by a set of 16 noun classes whose agreements are complicated and numerous.

Yanyuwa is a critically endangered language. The anthropologist John Bradley has worked with the Yanyuwa people for three decades and is also a speaker of Yanyuwa. He has produced a large dictionary and grammar of the language, along with a cultural atlas in collaboration with a core group of senior men and women.

Phonology
Yanyuwa is extremely unusual in having 7 places of articulation for stops, compared to 3 for English and 4–6 for most other Australian languages. Also unusual is the fact that Yanyuwa has no voiceless phoneme, as all its consonants are voiced (vowels are by default voiced, as is the norm in most languages).

Consonants

Vowels

Morphology

Noun classes
Yanyuwa has 16 noun classes, distinguished by prefixes. In some cases, different prefixes are used, depending on whether the speaker is a male or a female.

Notes

  Women's speech.
  Men's speech.
There is only one word in Yanyuwa,  "girl", in which the  prefix is always used. That distinguishes it from the men's speech form  "boy" for which women say .
   is used to indicate no prefix.

Male and female dialects
Yanyuwa is unusual among languages of the world in that it has separate dialects for men and for women at the morphological level. The only time that men use the women's dialect is if they are quoting someone of the opposite sex and vice versa.
An example of this speech is provided below:

(w) 

(m) 

The little boy went down to the river and saw his brother.

The BBC reported in 2018 that there were 3 fluent female speakers worldwide.

Speech styles
In Yanyuwa, certain words have synonyms used to replace the everyday term in certain cultural situations.

Avoidance speech
Avoidance speech is speech style used when talking to or near certain relatives: one's siblings and cousins of the opposite sex, one's brother-in-law, sister-in-law, father-in-law and mother-in-law, and one's nieces and nephews if their father (for male speakers) or their mother (for female speakers) has died. Occasionally, avoidance speech takes the form of different affixes to usual speech, but generally, it is simply a change in vocabulary.

An example of avoidance speech is given below:

Avoidance: 

Normal: 

He is going to the fire to cook food.

Ritual speech
Another set of vocabulary is used during ceremonies and other ritual occasions. Many of the words used in ritual speech are sacred and kept secret.

That is one ritual term which is known to the general public, as are some other terms for flora and fauna.

Island speech
When on the Sir Edward Pellew Group of Islands, which is part of Yanyuwa territory, another set of vocabulary may be used to replace the terms used when on the mainland. There is more variance about the usage of island speech than the other speech styles.

Classification
Dixon (2002), who rejects the validity of Pama–Nyungan, accepts that Yanyuwa is demonstrably related to Warluwara and languages closely related to it.

Culture

Films
Yanyuwa-speakers have actively engaged in making a number of films, and more recently have begun a project to animate important stories and songlines. These include three important films, all of which have extensive narratives in Yanyuwa, with subtitles:
 Kanymarda Yuwa – Two Laws,
 Buwarrala Akarriya – Journey East,
 Ka-wayawayama – Aeroplane Dance.

Music
Singer Shellie Morris released in May 2013 a song album Ngambala Wiji Li-Wunungu – Together We are Strong, with songs in Yanyuwa.

References

External links
Yanyuwa recordings demonstrating the seven POAs.
Yanyuwa Wuka: Language from Yanyuwa Country – a Yanyuwa Dictionary and Cultural Resource 

Agglutinative languages
Ngarna languages
Endangered indigenous Australian languages in the Northern Territory